The Nod Glas Formation (also known as the Nod Glas Black Shale, the Cadnant Shale, the Penarwel Mudstones or just Nod Glas) is an Ordovician lithostratigraphic group (a sequence of rock strata) in Mid Wales. The rock of the formation is made up of pyritous, graptolitic mudstone that is generally black in colour. It weathers to a soft, very well cleaved and coal-like material. The formation runs from Conwy in the north, down to Cardigan Bay in the area around Aberdyfi and Tywyn, though it is not a continuous over this area.

The formation is the topmost of the Caradoc Series in North Wales, and the name refers to all the black shale beds in the area. In South Wales, the equivalent beds of shale are called the Dicranograptus Shales.

North Wales 
The section between Aberllefenni and Aberangell is the type locality for the formation. North of Corris, towards Bwlch y Groes, the formation gradually thins and ceases entirely at the pass. Just north of Dinas Mawddwy, at Aber Cywarch the exposed shale beds contain thin layers of limestone.

There is a further significant layer of the Nod Glas running along the Conwy and Lledr vallies. Within the Dolwyddelan syncline the shales have been compressed and are quarried in Chwarel Ddu as slate. There are further outcroppings around Betws-y-coed where again there was some quarrying of the formation as slate.

Fossils 
Fossils of graptolites, conodonts and trilobites have been found in the Nod Glas Formation near Welshpool.

Other uses 
The term Nod Glas was also used in Wales to denote a blue-black sheep mark.

References

Ordovician System of Europe
Upper Ordovician Series
Rock formations of Wales